Air Force Station Arjan Singh , formerly Panagarh Airport, is an airport serving the city of Panagarh, in the state of West Bengal in India. Now it is an Air Force base under Eastern Air Command of Indian Air Force.

Units
 No. 87 Squadron (Lockheed C-130J Super Hercules)
 BAE Hawk

History
During World War II, the airport was used as a supply transport airfield from 1942 to 1945 by the United States Army Air Forces Tenth Air Force and as a repair and maintenance depot for B-24 Liberator heavy bombers by Air Technical Service Command.

The airport has numerous wartime relics, with abandoned taxiways and a large concrete parking ramp remaining, although not used and in a deteriorating state.

In 2018 the airport was renamed after Arjan Singh.

Facilities
The airport is at an elevation of 73 m (240 ft) above mean sea level. It has one runway designated 15/33 with an asphalt surface measuring 2743 m by 46 m (9000 ft by 150 ft).

The Air Force is planning to deploy six mid-air refueling tanker aircraft at Panagarh air base in West Bengal. With the deployment of these tanker aircraft in Panagarh, the striking range of fighter planes like Su-30 MKIs based in Tezpur and Chabua (both in Assam) will be enhanced as these can get fuel mid-air. Panagarh is also the likely location of a proposed Army Mountain Corps headquarter.
AFS Arjan Singh is another training base for Paratroopers. Paratrooper Training School in Agra have already set up their base here to train Special Forces for operations at night, even beyond the country's borders.

References

External links
 

Indian Air Force bases
Airfields of the United States Army Air Forces in British India
Airports in West Bengal
Transport in Durgapur
Year of establishment missing